Irreconcilables, in the context of the Philippines, were a group of former insurrectionists who, because of their unwillingness to swear allegiance to the government of the United States after their capture by U.S. forces during the Philippine-American War. were deported from the Philippinnes to the island of Guam by the U.S. Military Government of the Philippine.

Deportation
The deportation was effectuated by an order issued by Major General Arthur MacArthur Jr., the then U.S. Military Governor of the Philippines. The order read as follows:

At the time this order was issued, the Philippine-American War was still underway. Prior to issuing this order, MacArthur has obtained authority to do so from the United States Secretary of War.

Notable deportees
Apolinario Mabini, Prime Minister of the First Philippine Republic
Artemio Ricarte, Commanding General of the Philippine Revolutionary Army
Pio del Pilar, Lieutenant General, Congressman from Negros Oriental
Maximo Hizon. Congressman from Sorsogon
Mariano Llanera, Lieutenant General
Francisco de los Santos, General officer

Detention and later release
An initial group of more than thirty leaders of Philippine Revolution, including Pio del Pilar and Apolinario Mabini were transported to Guam abord the SS Rosecrans  Gaum's governor, Seaton Schroeder was unprepared for their arrival, and they remained abard ship in Apra Harbor. A week later, on February 1, 1901 the USS Solace arriv4ed with eleven more deportees, who were transferred to join the others on the Rosecrans while a three acre site between Piti and Hagåtña, GuamAgaña was razed and construction of the Presidio (prison) de Asan began.

On February 12, 43 prisoners and 15 servants disembarked at Piti and trekked for two miles to Asan, where they were initially housed under guard in tents. Construction of the prison ws completed on March 22. Prison facilities included exercise equipment, a small library, a dining room, and a kitchen separate from the prison barracks and run by servants. Each prisoner was assigned 28 square feet of floor space, an army cot, and shelf space for personal items.

Most deportees agreed to take the U.S. oath of allegiance after some time in detention and were returned to the Philippines. Mabini and Ricarte were exceptions.

Mabini refused to take the oath until February 1903, when he was formally notified that he could leave Guam to go anywhere other than the Philippines. Rather than accept this, he took the oath in order to be allowed to return. February 26, 1903. On the day he sailed, he issued this statement to the press:

Mabini died on May 13, 1903, less than three months safter his return from exile, at the age of 38.

Ricarte never took the oath. He was deported to Hong Kong in February 1903 and secretly returned to the Philippines in 1904. After being arrested and imprisoned, he was deported in 1910 to Hong Kong in 1910. He moved to Japan, living in Yokohama and returning to the Philippines in mid 1942, while he Philippines was under wartime Japanese rule.

References

 

 
Conflicts in 1901
Conflicts in 1902
History of the Philippines (1898–1946)
Invasions by the United States
Rebellions in the Philippines
Philippines–United States military relations
Wars involving the Philippines
Wars involving the United States